Manhattan is an album by American flugelhornist Art Farmer featuring performances recorded in 1981 and released on the Soul Note label.

Reception
The Allmusic review called the album "of great interest to fans of Art Farmer".

Track listing
  "Context' (Kenny Drew) – 6:53   
 "Blue Wail" (Drew) – 5:06   
 "Manhattan" (Lorenz Hart, Richard Rodgers) – 6:50   
 "Passport" (Charlie Parker) – 6:48   
 "Arrival" (Horace Parlan) – 6:51   
 "Back Door Beauty" (Bennie Wallace) – 6:17

Personnel
Art Farmer – flugelhorn
Sahib Shihab – soprano saxophone, baritone saxophone
Kenny Drew – piano
Mads Vinding – bass
Ed Thigpen – drums

References 

Black Saint/Soul Note albums
Art Farmer albums
1982 albums